Tuuliset tienoot is the second album by Finnish pop rock band Indica, released in 2005. It spent a total of 27 weeks in the Finnish Top 40, peaking at number 12 in February 2006.

Track listing
Vuorien taa (Behind the Mountains) - 3:16
Pidä kädestä (Hold my Hand) - 3:49
Tuuliset tienoot (Windy Shires) - 3:59
Lapsuuden metsä (Childhood Forest) - 5:07
Häkkilintu (Bird Cage) - 3:21
Varo (Watch Out) - 4:17
Niin tuleni teen (That's How I Make My Fire) - 3:48
Kummajaisten joukko (A Number of Freaks) - 4:11
Rannalla (On The Beach) - 5:21
Viimeinen tanssi (The Last Dance) - 3:20

References

2005 albums
Indica (band) albums